Papyrus Oxyrhynchus 126 (P. Oxy. 126 or P. Oxy. I 126) is a notice to a revenue officer, written in Greek and discovered in Oxyrhynchus. The manuscript was written on papyrus in the form of a sheet. The document was written on 10 May 572. Currently it is housed in the Egyptian Museum (10085) in Cairo.

Description 
The document contains a notification by Stephanous, with the consent of her husband Marcus (a "chief physician") to a revenue officer. Stephanous agrees that she will, in the future, pay in full or in part some annual fees paid to date by her father, John, in consideration of her having received from him a gift of land as a dowry.

It was discovered by Grenfell and Hunt in 1897 in Oxyrhynchus. The text was published by Grenfell and Hunt in 1898.

See also 
 Oxyrhynchus Papyri
 Papyrus Oxyrhynchus 125
 Papyrus Oxyrhynchus 127

References 

126
6th-century manuscripts
Byzantine manuscripts
Egyptian Museum